C. communis may refer to:

 Catocala communis, a synonym for Catocala neogama, the bride, a moth of the family Noctuidae
 Commelina communis, the Asiatic dayflower, an herbaceous annual plant in the dayflower family

See also
 Communis (disambiguation)